, JIU, is a private university established in 1992, with two campuses, one in Tōgane, Chiba Prefecture, Japan, and one in Kioi-chō, Chiyoda-ku, and a smaller learning center in Awa Kamogawa.

Undergraduate programs include International Humanities, Japanese Language, Management and Information Science, Media Studies, Nursing, Pharmaceutical Sciences, Social and Environmental Studies, Social Work Studies, and Tourism. Graduate programs offer degrees in Humanities (M.A. in Women's Studies / Inter-Cultural Studies / Global Communication; Ph.D. in Comparative Cultures), Management and Information Sciences (MBA and Ph.D. in Management of Entrepreneurial Ventures), Social Work (M.A. in Social Welfare), Business Design (MBA in Business Design), and Pharmaceutical Science (Doctor of Pharmacology).

External links
 

Educational institutions established in 1992
Private universities and colleges in Japan
Universities and colleges in Chiba Prefecture
Tōgane
Kamogawa, Chiba
1992 establishments in Japan